Stevenage mail centre was a Royal Mail mail centre in Stevenage, Hertfordshire, England.

In 2010, Royal Mail announced that a number of sorting offices from around the Home counties, including the Stevenage, Hitchin, Berkhamsted and Welwyn Garden City would be closed and merged into a large mail processing centre in Hemel Hempstead. These closures initiated a protest by the workers at the Stevenage mail centre, and members of the CWU in November 2010

It underwent partial closure in 2012, though it remains an active Royal Mail facility as of 2017.

References

The Welwyn Garden City Royal Mail Delivery Office did not close and remains open today as a stand-alone delivery office, this was after a successful campaign by the CWU Northern Home Counties Postal Branch which with the help of the local MP Grant Snapps  helped win the day, the  CWU campaign which was run by Branch Secretary Tom Walker and Area Delivery Rep Paul Grace, After many months of arguing the members at Welwyn Garden City Delivery Office won their victory and right to continue serving the people of Welwyn Garden City from within Welwyn Garden City.
 

Royal Mail
Stevenage